Roberto Pellandra (born 10 September 1972) is a Sammarinese swimmer. He competed in the men's 50 metre freestyle event at the 1992 Summer Olympics.

References

1972 births
Living people
Sammarinese male swimmers
Olympic swimmers of San Marino
Swimmers at the 1992 Summer Olympics
Swimmers from Rome